Ban Sang may refer to:

 Ban Sang District, Prachinburi Province, Thailand
 Ban Sang, Phayao, Thailand